Alexievsky Cross is a stone, tabernacle, worship cross of the fourteenth century. Four-pointed, with widening ends (168.4'124.25). Installed  (hence its name) on the western wall of the Sophia Cathedral in Weliky Novgorod.

Description 
It was carved out of limestone and is 174 cm high. The shape of the Alexius cross is traditional for Novgorod crosses of the XIV century. The branches are decorated with reliefs depicting Gospel scenes: at the top - The Annunciation of the Blessed Virgin Mary, on the left - The Birth of Christ, on the right - The Descent of Christ into Hell, below - The Ascension of the Lord. An inscription with the customer's name and a prayer is carved on the outer side:

The inscription is given according to the version of T. V. Nikolaeva, who offered an interpretation of "Shchagola" as a modified name of Choglova Ulitsa (street) in Novgorod.

History 
There are various assumptions about the purpose and time of the cross. The first mention of it is in the 1858 inventory of St. Sophia Cathedral, compiled by protoiereus Peter Solovyov. Archimandrite  linked the creation of the cross to the internecine conflict in Novgorod in 1359. В. V. Stasov dated it to the period of the chairmanship of archbishop Alexius (July 12, 1360 - April 1388). Epigraphy, stylistic and iconography observations allowed T.V. Nikolaeva to date the cross to the time after 1380 and consider it a monument in honor of Kulikovo battle.

The lower part of the cross was lost during the World War II (1941-1945)]; reconstructed in gypsum in 1950-1960s. Currently, the cross is located in the Cathedral of St. Sophia. As a bow it is installed inside the cathedral to the left of the central (Assumption) iconostasis.

References

Literature (in Russian) 

 Описание новгородского Софийского собора, составленное протоиереем Петром Соловьёвым с четырьми рисунками акад. Ф. Солнцева и летописным указателем П. Савваитова. — СПб., 1858. — С. 64—65.
 Макарий [Миролюбов], архим. Археологическое описание церковных древностей Новгорода и его окрестностей. — М., 1860. — Ч. 1. — С. 52—53.
 Стасов В. В. Каменный крест Новгородского Софийского собора // Изв. РАО. — СПб., 1861. — Т. 3. — Вып. 5. — Стб. 423—427. Табл. 3.
 Срезневский И. И. Древние памятники русского письма и языка. — СПб., 1882. — С. 216—217.
 Спицын А. А. Заметка о каменных крестах, преимущественно Новгородских // Записки отделения русской и славянской археологии. — СПб., 1903. — Т. 5. — Вып. 1.
 Шляпкин И. А. Древние русские кресты. — СПб., 1906. — 1 : Кресты новгородские до XV века, неподвижные и не церковной службы.
 Орлов А. С. Библиография русских надписей XI—XV вв. — М. ; Л., 1952. — No. 129.
 Николаева Т. В. Победный крест XIV в. // Древнерусское искусство. — М., 1984. — [Вып. :] XIV—XV вв. — С. 86—93.
 Гордиенко Э. А. Комментарий к описи вотчинам новгородского архиерея и церковной утвари 1763 г. // Новгородский исторический сборник. — СПб., 1995. — Вып. 5 (15). — С. 267.

Memorial crosses
Pages with unreviewed translations